Latin alpha (majuscule: Ɑ, minuscule: ɑ) or script a is a letter of the Latin alphabet based on one lowercase form of a, or on the Greek lowercase alpha (α).

Usage
 In the International Phonetic Alphabet,  represents an open back unrounded vowel, while  represents an open front unrounded vowel. It has the shape of a script-a.
 Also in the General Alphabet of Cameroon Languages,  usually represents an open back unrounded vowel, while  represents an open front unrounded vowel.  The former is used in the orthographies of several languages of Cameroon, including:
 Fe'fe'
 Mbembe
 Mbo (?): but not Akoose, though it does have phonemes /aa/ and /ɑɑ/; nor Bakaka.
 in some languages, the script-a form (also called literacy form) of the letter , with the lowercase much like the IPA , is used and should not be confused with the Latin alpha  of the GACL; for example, in Muyang, the literacy  represents an open-mid central unrounded vowel but it is not ; the Latin alpha is not used.

In Cameroon languages,  must look like the classical lowercase Greek alpha to better differentiate it from the letter a in script form.

 is used in the Uralic Phonetic Alphabet.

 is used in the Teuthonista phonetic transcription system.

 is used in Americanist phonetic notation.

Typography

Encoding and forms
In Unicode, "Latin alpha" and "Latin script a" are considered to be the same character, which has an uppercase and a lowercase form and is referred to as "Latin letter alpha".

See also
Latin turned alpha
G, which also has two distinct minuscule forms

References

A, Latin alpha
Phonetic transcription symbols
Vowel letters